Gary Goff is an American football coach. He is the head football coach at McNeese State University in Lake Charles, Louisiana, a role he assumed in December 2021. Goff served as the head football coach at Tiffin University in Tiffin, Ohio from 2011 to 2018 and Valdosta State University in Valdosta, Georgia from 2019 to 2021. He led his 2021 Valdosta team the NCAA Division II Football Championship Game, where they lost to Ferris State.

Head coaching record

College

References

External links
 
 McNeese profile
 Valdosta State profile

Year of birth missing (living people)
Living people
American football wide receivers
Iowa Wesleyan Tigers football coaches
McNeese Cowboys football coaches
New Mexico State Aggies football coaches
Princeton Tigers football coaches
Southeastern Louisiana Lions football coaches
Tiffin Dragons football coaches
Valdosta State Blazers football coaches
Valdosta State Blazers football players
West Virginia Wesleyan Bobcats football coaches
High school football coaches in Georgia (U.S. state)
People from Picayune, Mississippi
Coaches of American football from Mississippi
Players of American football from Mississippi